Garrett Bradley Grayson (born May 29, 1991) is a former American football quarterback. He was drafted by the New Orleans Saints in the third round of the 2015 NFL Draft. He played college football at Colorado State.

Early years
Grayson attended Heritage High School in Vancouver, Washington, where he was a three-sport standout in football, basketball, and track. In football, he was a three-year starting quarterback and three-year letterwinner, also played free safety, cornerback and wide receiver, and served two seasons as a team captain. He guided the Timberwolves to three straight Class 4A playoff berths and a GSHL championship in 2008. He broke most of Washington's Class 4A state passing records, and had the nation's highest completion percentage as a senior (73.2 percent), topping over 10,000 yards in total offense during his career. He garnered consecutive Greater St. Helens League MVP honors, in 2008 and 2009.

Also a standout track & field athlete, Grayson lettered all four years competing in sprinting, hurdling, jumping and relays events. His personal records include 110 hurdles (15.20 s) and 300 hurdles (40.57 s) In sprints, he ran the 100-meter dash in 11.03 seconds  and the 200-meter dash in 24.00 seconds. In addition, he also clocked a 4.6-second 40-yard dash, bench-pressed 290 pounds, squatted 430 and had a 38-inch vertical jump.

Grayson was ranked by Rivals.com as a three-star recruit and the 22nd best dual-threat quarterback in his class. He was ranked the No. 17 overall prospect from the state of Washington. He chose to attend Colorado State over scholarship offers from Miami (OH), Eastern Washington, and Idaho State.

College career
As a true freshman at Colorado State University in 2011, Grayson started three of four games he played in. He completed 43 of his 77 pass attempts for 542 yards, two touchdowns, and six interceptions. Grayson entered his sophomore season in 2012 as the starter until he was injured in the team's fifth game against Air Force. He appeared in only one game as a backup after that. Overall, he appeared in six games, going 78 of 138 for 946 yards with seven touchdowns and three interceptions. Grayson started all 14 games as a junior in 2013. He finished the year with a school record 3,696 passing yards. He also had 23 touchdowns. Grayson returned as a starter in 2014. In the game against Utah State, Grayson passed Kelly Stouffer to become Colorado State's all-time passing yards leader.

Statistics

Source:

Professional career

New Orleans Saints
The New Orleans Saints drafted Grayson in the third round, 75th overall, in the 2015 NFL Draft. He did not appear in a game for the Saints during his rookie year.

On September 7, 2016, Grayson was released by the Saints and was re-signed to the practice squad. He signed a reserve/future contract with the Saints on January 2, 2017. He was waived on September 2, 2017.

Atlanta Falcons
On October 17, 2017, Grayson was signed to the Atlanta Falcons' practice squad. He was released on November 8, 2017, but was re-signed six days later. He signed a reserve/future contract with the Falcons on January 15, 2018.

On September 1, 2018, Grayson was waived by the Falcons.

Denver Broncos
On October 25, 2018 Grayson was signed to the Denver Broncos' practice squad. On January 2, 2019, Grayson was re-signed to reserve/future contract.

On May 2, 2019, the Broncos waived Grayson.

Retirement
On August 8, 2019, it was reported that Grayson confirmed he was "stepping away" from football after declining an offer from the Atlanta Falcons.

References

External links
Colorado State Rams bio

1991 births
Living people
Sportspeople from Vancouver, Washington
Players of American football from Washington (state)
American football quarterbacks
Colorado State Rams football players
New Orleans Saints players
Atlanta Falcons players
Salt Lake Stallions players
Denver Broncos players